The men's road race H5 cycling event at the 2020 Summer Paralympics took place on 1 September 2021, at the Fuji Speedway in Tokyo. Eight riders competed in the event.

The H5 classification is for athletes who can kneel on a handcycle, a category that includes paraplegics and amputees. These riders operated using a hand-operated cycle.

Results
The event took place on 1 September 2021, at 9:30:

References

Men's road race H5